Florin Cristian Pârvu (born 2 April 1975) is a Romanian professional football manager and former player, who is currently in charge of Liga I club Petrolul Ploiești.

International

Honours
Dinamo București
Divizia A: 2001–02
Cupa României: 2002–03

External links

1975 births
Living people
Sportspeople from Ploiești
Romanian footballers
Romanian expatriate footballers
Romania international footballers
Liga I players
Liga II players
Liga III players
Association football midfielders
FC Dinamo București players
FC Petrolul Ploiești players
FC Brașov (1936) players
FC U Craiova 1948 players
CS Otopeni players
CS Turnu Severin players
Al Jahra SC players
Henan Songshan Longmen F.C. players
FC Stal Alchevsk players
Expatriate footballers in Kuwait
Expatriate footballers in China
Romanian expatriate sportspeople in Kuwait
Romanian expatriate sportspeople in China
AEL Limassol players
Romanian expatriate sportspeople in Cyprus
Cypriot First Division players
Expatriate footballers in Cyprus
Expatriate footballers in Ukraine
Romanian expatriate sportspeople in Ukraine
FC Petrolul Ploiești managers
Liga I managers